{{Infobox university
|name = The University of the Gambia
|latin_name = Universities in the Gambia
|image_name = 
|image_size = 150px
|mottoeng = Knowledge Truth Development
|motto = 
|established = 1999
|demonym = 
|faculty = 313 (2017)
|staff = 
|chancellor = President Adama Barrow  
|city = Sere Kunda
|country = The Gambia
|campus = Kal Jawara Memorial Block (MDI), Kanifing South, Sere Kunda)Royal Victoria Teaching Hospital (Banjul) Gambia College (Brikama) 
|students = 6000 approx (in September  2017)
|undergrad = 
|postgrad = 
|endowment = 
|colours = 
|athletics = 
|type = Public
|affiliations = St. Mary's College of Maryland  Alliance française<ref>[http://thepoint.gm/africa/gambia/article/2008/11/4/alliance-franco-gambienne-the-mother-of-french-learning The Point Newspaper "Alliance Franco Gambienne: The Mother of French Learning]</ref> Saint Mary's University (Halifax)
|website = http://www.utg.edu.gm/
|logo = 
}}

The University of the Gambia (UTG) is an institution of higher education located in Sere Kunda, the largest city in the Gambia.

History

The campus was founded in 1998 in Kotu-Kanifing, a suburb of Sere Kunda. It was not until March 1999 that the UTG started to offer courses, following a law passed by the National Assembly of the Gambia. In 1999, 300 students are reported to have been enrolled. As of 2002, the number of academic staff was 44. In 2006, nearly 2000 students were enrolled. The Gambian government has planned to create a new campus at Faraba Banta.

Schools

The UTG is composed of several schools (or faculties) :

School of Agriculture and Environment Sciences, Brikama
School of Arts and Sciences, Faraba
School of Business and Public Administration
School of Education
Faculty of Law
School of Journalism and Digital Media, Kanifing
School of Engineering and Architecture
School of Medicine and Allied Health Sciences
School of Information Technology and Communications
School of Graduate Studies and Research
 UTG Digital Campus
 UTG North Bank Campus, Farafenni

Degrees
The qualifications that can be attained include :

Bachelor in Education
Bachelor of Arts in Christian Religious Studies
Bachelor of Law (LLB)
Bachelor of Medicine / Surgery (MBChB)
Bachelor of Science in Accounting
Bachelor of Science in Agriculture
Bachelor of Science in Biology
Bachelor of Science in Chemistry
Bachelor of Science in Communications & Media
Bachelor of Science in Computer Science
Bachelor of Science in Economics
Bachelor of Science in Environment Science
Bachelor of Science in Information Systems
Bachelor of Science in Management
Bachelor of Science in Nursing and Midwifery
Bachelor of Science in Physics
Bachelor of science in Planning and Design 
Bachelor of Science in Political Science 
Bachelor of Science in Public Health
Bachelor of Science in Software Engineering
Bachelor of Science in Telecommunications & Wireless Technologies
Master of Arts in African History
Master of Arts in French
Master of Law (LLM)
Master of Science in Climate Change and Education (WASCAL Master Research Program)
Master of Science in Public Health

Academic staff
Notable past and present lecturers at the UTG include the following:
PaSara Drammeh, IT Manager 
Alhaji Alieu Ebrima Cham Joof, lecturer of history.
Musu Bakoto Sawo, lecturer in international human rights law and winner of the "2020 African of the Year Award" from Daily Trust''.
Bukhari M.S. Sillah, lecturer of economics.
Saja Taal, lecturer in political science.

Role in public health
On October 11, 2012, it was reported that the university has started two master's degree programs in public health in collaboration with the University of Illinois at Springfield and the University of Iowa. According to Vaccine News Daily: "Rex Kuye, the head of the public health department, said that the two programs were conceived of locally to address growing health concerns in the Gambia. The Gambia has made many public health strides in the last two decades. The nation was certified as polio free in 2004 and has had no confirmed polio cases since that time. The success in the battle against polio resulted from high political commitment and routine polio immunization coverage of more than 90 percent since 1990, according to the Foroyaa Newspaper."

See also

 List of universities in the Gambia

References

External links
 Official website of The University of The Gambia
 The Gambia State House press statement 6 March 2004
 The Gambia State House press statement  10 December 2005

 
Educational institutions established in 1999
1999 establishments in the Gambia